The 2021–22 Southern Combination Football League season was the 97th in the history of the competition, which lies at levels 9 and 10 of the English football league system.

The provisional club allocations for steps 5 and 6 were announced by The Football Association on 18 May.

After the abandonment of the 2019–20 and 2020–21 seasons due to the COVID-19 pandemic, a number of promotions were decided on a points per game basis over the previous two seasons.

Premier Division

The Premier Division consisted of 20 clubs, including 17 clubs from the previous season, and three clubs, promoted from Division One:
 AFC Varndeanians
 Bexhill United
 Littlehampton Town

League table

Inter-step play-off

Results table

Results by matchday

Top scorers

Stadia and locations

Division One

Division One increased to 18 clubs, including 13 clubs from the previous season, and five new clubs:
 Dorking Wanderers reserves, transferred from Combined Counties League Division One
 Epsom & Ewell, transferred from Combined Counties League Division One
 Forest Row, promoted from the Mid Sussex Football League
 Godalming Town, transferred from Combined Counties League Division One
 Montpelier Villa, promoted from Division Two

League table

Play-offs

Semi-finals

Final

Results table

Results by matchday

Top scorers

Stadia and locations

Division Two

Division Two consisted of 14 clubs, including 13 clubs from the previous season, and one new club:
 Southwater, transferred from the West Sussex Football League

Promotion from this division depended on ground grading as well as league position.

League table

Results table

Results by matchday

Top scorers

Stadia and locations

Peter Bentley League Challenge Cup
Source: 2021-22 Peter Bentley Challenge Cup

First round

Second round

Third round

Quarter-finals

Semi-finals

Final

References

2021-22
9